Passaic City School District is a comprehensive community public school district located in Passaic, New Jersey, United States, serving students in pre-kindergarten through twelfth grade. The district is one of 31 former Abbott districts statewide that were established pursuant to the decision by the New Jersey Supreme Court in Abbott v. Burke which are now referred to as "SDA Districts" based on the requirement for the state to cover all costs for school building and renovation projects in these districts under the supervision of the New Jersey Schools Development Authority.

As of the 2018–19 school year, the district, comprising 17 schools, had an enrollment of 14,504 students and 839.8 classroom teachers (on an FTE basis), for a student–teacher ratio of 17.3:1.

The district is classified by the New Jersey Department of Education as being in District Factor Group "A", the lowest of eight groupings. District Factor Groups organize districts statewide to allow comparison by common socioeconomic characteristics of the local districts. From lowest socioeconomic status to highest, the categories are A, B, CD, DE, FG, GH, I and J.

Schools
Schools in the district (with 2018–19 enrollment data from the National Center for Education Statistics) are:

Preschools
 Vincent Capuana School No. 15 (277; PreK)
Janet Drago, Principal
 Sallie D. Gamble School No. 16 (465; PreK)
Dr. Terrence Love, Principal

Elementary schools
 Thomas Jefferson School No. 1 (788; K-8)
Karen Fragale, Principal
 George Washington School No. 2 (172; K-1)
 Mario J. Drago School No. 3 (formerly Franklin School) (803; PreK-8)
Diana Kattak, Principal
 Benito Juárez School No. 5 (472; K-8)
Steven Cruz, Principal
 Martin Luther King Jr. School No. 6 (1,124; PreK-8)
Stacey Bruce, Principal
 Ulysses S. Grant School No. 7 (391; PreK-1)
Gulamhussein Janoowalla, Principal
 Casimir Pulaski School No. 8 (%32; PreK-8)
Emmanuel Morales, Principal
 Etta Gero School No. 9 (690; 2-8)
Leandra Ragone, Principal
 Theodore Roosevelt School No. 10 (905; PreK-8)
Luis Colon, Principal
 William B. Cruise Veterans Memorial School No. 11 (1,253; K-8)
Manuel Negron, Principal
 Daniel F. Ryan School No. 19 (874; PreK/2-8)
Fawzi Naji, Principal
 Passaic Gifted and Talented Academy School No. 20 (959; 2-8)
John Mellody, Principal
 Sonia Sotomayor School No. 21 (PreK-5)
Tiffany Allen, Principal

Middle / high school
 Passaic Academy for Science and Engineering (702; 6-11)
Johanna Ross, Principal
 Passaic Preparatory Academy (701; 6-11)
Dr. Jason Marx, Principal

High school
 Passaic High School (2,618; 9-12)
Jeannette Torres, Principal

Administration
Core members of the district's administration are:
Sandra Montañez-Diodonet, Superintendent
R. Aaron Bowman, Business Administrator / Board Secretary

Board of education
The district's board of education, comprised of nine members, sets policy and oversees the fiscal and educational operation of the district through its administration. As a Type II school district, the board's trustees are elected directly by voters to serve three-year terms of office on a staggered basis, with three seats up for election each year held as part of the April school election. The board appoints a superintendent to oversee the district's day-to-day operations and a business administrator to supervise the business functions of the district. As one of the 13 districts statewide with school elections in April, voters also decide on passage of the annual school budget.

References

External links
Passaic City School District
 
School Data for the Passaic City School District, National Center for Education Statistics

Passaic, New Jersey
New Jersey Abbott Districts
New Jersey District Factor Group A
School districts in Passaic County, New Jersey